Quran is the Holy Book of Allah in Islam.

Quran or Qurʾan or Qurʾān may also refer to:
 Algeria Quran - an Algerian Mus'haf of the Quran.
 Ali Quran - a Mus'haf manuscript of the Quran.
 Birmingham Quran manuscript - a Mus'haf manuscript of the Quran.
 Blood Quran - a Mus'haf manuscript of the Quran.
 Blue Quran - a Mus'haf manuscript of the Quran.
 Challenge of the Quran - a challenge proposed in the Quran.
 Codex Parisino-petropolitanus Quran - a Mus'haf manuscript of the Quran.
 Criticism of the Quran - an area of study on the content of the Quran.
 Early Quranic manuscripts - Mus'haf manuscripts of the Quran.
 Encyclopaedia of the Qurʾān - an encyclopedia dedicated to Quranic Studies.
 History of the Quran - a timeline and origin of Quran.
 Human rights in the Quran - rights bestowed upon humans in the Quran.
 List of chapters in the Quran - a division of Quran content.
 List of characters and names mentioned in the Quran - an enumeration of specific words in the Quran text.
List of tafsir works - Tafsir is a body of commentary and explication, aimed to exegesis of the Qur'an.
 Miniature Quran - a tiny-written Quran.
 Muhammad in the Quran - an enumeration of the Prophet Muhammad in the Quran text.
 Prostration of Quran recitation - a Quran recitation ritual in Islam.
 Quran and miracles - concepts related to the verses of the Quran.
 Quran translations - interpretations of the scripture of Islam in languages other than Arabic.
 Samarkand Kufic Quran - a Mus'haf manuscript of the Quran.
 Sanaa Quran - a Mus'haf manuscript of the Quran.
 Thaalibia Quran - an Algerian Mus'haf of the Quran.
 Timurid Quran manuscript - a Mus'haf manuscript of the Quran.
 Topkapi Quran - a Mus'haf manuscript of the Quran.
 Uthman Taha Quran - a modern Mus'haf of the Quran.
 Women in the Quran - female characters and subjects in the Quran text.

See also 
 
 
 Qiraat